Paharpur is a village in Bakshi Ka Talab block of Lucknow district, Uttar Pradesh, India. As of 2011, its population is 2,545, in 485 households. It is the seat of a gram panchayat, which also includes the village of Mohammadpur Saraia. This is village of social activist Late Shri Jagdev Prasad Tiwari who was principal of many schools,a renowned poet ,whole life member of BKT inter college and director of district cooperative bank ,This is the village of present MLA of Bakhshi Ka Talab constituency Shri Yogesh Shukla also.

References 

Villages in Lucknow district